Matt Hanutke Pittsville, Wisconsin high school and college wrestler is one of only 18 wrestlers who have won four State individual titles. Hanutke was the first wrestler in Wisconsin state history to go undefeated through his entire high school career (117-0). He was a 4 time All-American (118 pounds) at the University of Wisconsin–Madison. In 2007 he was inducted into the Wisconsin Wrestling Hall of Fame.

Education
Pittsville High School class of 1990
University of Wisconsin Bachelor of Science degree in Resource Management.

Career
Hanutke was the first 4 year undefeated high school wrestler in the state of Wisconsin. He won four individual state titles. In his senior year he pinned Derrick Meyer in the title match at 119 pounds (class C).

He also wrestled in the first ever National High School Wrestling Championships held in 1990 at the University of Pittsburgh in Pennsylvania. He was defeated 9-6 in the 112 pound final by Bobby Young. He was a Big Ten wrestling champion in 1993. In 1994 he sustained a knee injury that caused him to miss part of his senior year.

In 2007 he was inducted into the Wisconsin Wrestling Hall of Fame.

Awards
4 time Individual State Champion Wrestler in Wisconsin 119
1990 Asics Tiger High School All-American Team (3rd Team)
Big Ten Championship|Big Ten Champion
4 time All-American
Wisconsin Wrestling Hall of Fame (2007)

Personal
Matt Hanutke is married to Beth and lives in Chippewa Falls, WI. The couple has two sons. Hanutke works for Chippewa Falls Area Unified School District in Chippewa Falls, Wisconsin.

Books
Great Moments in Wisconsin SportsThe Golden Era of Amateur Wrestling: 1980SOn Wisconsin!: The History of Badger Athletics''

References

External links 
Matt Hanutke

1972 births
Living people
American male sport wrestlers
Sportspeople from Milwaukee
University of Wisconsin–Madison alumni
Wisconsin Badgers wrestlers